Chrysozephyrus birupa, the fawn hairstreak, is a small butterfly found in India that belongs to the lycaenids or blues family.

Taxonomy
The butterfly was previously classified as Thecla birupa Moore.

Range
The butterfly occurs in north west India from Simla to Kumaon, and in Nepal.

See also
Lycaenidae
List of butterflies of India (Lycaenidae)
Wikispecies

Cited references

References
  
 
 
 
 

Chrysozephyrus
Butterflies of Asia